The Punisher is the sixth eponymous Marvel Comics comic book series featuring the character Frank Castle, also known as the Punisher. It consists of 37 issues as part of the Marvel Knights imprint. Most of the issues in this series are written by Garth Ennis; however, Tom Peyer, Steve Dillon, and Ron Zimmerman also feature as writers.

Publication history
The series continues on from Ennis' The Punisher 2000 limited series. The Russian, who was decapitated in the previous series, is resurrected using stolen S.H.I.E.L.D. technology and returns as one of the main antagonists in this series.

Plot

Reception
The series holds an average rating of 5.1 by eight professional critics on the review aggregation website Comic Book Roundup.

Collected editions
The series has been collected into individual volumes. However, The Punisher #8-12 of vol. 6 were not written by Ennis and are not collected among the following volumes. Instead, the issues were collected in a separate paperback titled Marvel Knights Punisher by Peyer & Gutierrez: Taxi Wars. Included in the lone paperback is PUNISHER X-MAS SPECIAL (2006) #1, SPIDER-MAN VS. PUNISHER #1 and material from MARVEL KNIGHTS DOUBLE-SHOT #4 

Paperback:
Volume 1: Welcome Back, Frank (collects The Punisher vol. 5, #1-12), June 2001,  (Panini)
Volume 2: Army of One (collects The Punisher vol. 6, #1-7), February 2002, 
Volume 3: Business As Usual (collects The Punisher vol. 6, #13-18), November 2003, 
Volume 4: Full Auto (collects The Punisher vol. 6, #20-26), July 2003, 
Volume 5: Streets of Laredo (collects The Punisher vol. 6, #19, 27-32), December 2003, 
Volume 6: Confederacy of Dunces (collects The Punisher vol. 6, #33-37), July 2004, 

Hardcover:
Volume 1 (collects The Punisher vol. 5, #1-12; Marvel Knights: Double Shot #1; Punisher Kills the Marvel Universe), June 2002, 
Volume 2 (collects The Punisher vol. 6, #1-7, 13-18), June 2003, 
Volume 3 (collects The Punisher vol. 6, #19-27), March 2004, 

The Complete Collections:
Marvel Knights Punisher by Garth Ennis: The Complete Collection Vol. 1, (collects The Punisher vol. 5, #1-12; Marvel Knights: Double Shot #1; Punisher Kills the Marvel Universe), December 2018, 
Marvel Knights Punisher by Garth Ennis: The Complete Collection Vol. 2, (collects The Punisher vol. 6, #1-7, #13-26; Material From Marvel Knights Double Shot #1), March 2019, 
Marvel Knights Punisher by Garth Ennis: The Complete Collection Vol. 3, (collects The Punisher vol. 6, #27-37; Punisher: War Zone vol. 1, #1-6), June 2019,

See also
 2001 in comics

References

External links

Comics by Garth Ennis
Comics set in New York City
Defunct American comics